Dolgy is a rural locality (a khutor) in Bolshezhirovsky Selsoviet Rural Settlement, Fatezhsky District, Kursk Oblast, Russia. Population:

Geography 
The khutor is located 94 km from the Russia–Ukraine border, 30 km north-west of Kursk, 16.5 km south of the district center – the town Fatezh, 7 km from the selsoviet center – Bolshoye Zhirovo.

 Climate
Dolgy has a warm-summer humid continental climate (Dfb in the Köppen climate classification).

Transport 
Dolgy is located 7 km from the federal route  Crimea Highway as part of the European route E105, 29 km from the road of regional importance  (Kursk – Ponyri), 11 km from the road  (Fatezh – 38K-018), 1 km from the road of intermunicipal significance  (M2 "Crimea Highway" – Kromskaya), 29 km from the nearest railway halt Bukreyevka (railway line Oryol – Kursk).

The rural locality is situated 34.5 km from Kursk Vostochny Airport, 151 km from Belgorod International Airport and 231 km from Voronezh Peter the Great Airport.

References

Notes

Sources

Rural localities in Fatezhsky District